Palmless Prayer / Mass Murder Refrain is a collaborative studio album by Mono and World's End Girlfriend. It was originally released via Human Highway Records on 14 December 2005. In 2006, it was re-released via Temporary Residence Limited.

Critical reception

Ian Mathers of Stylus Magazine gave the album a grade of "A", writing, "I'd say this is one of the finest 'imaginary soundtracks' ever released if I could just think of a film that wouldn't seem hideously overpowered by it."

Shawn Dspres of The Japan Times commented that "Although broken down into distinct parts, the seamless transition between tracks makes the album play out like one extended, breathtaking piece."

Thom Jurek of AllMusic gave the album 3.5 out of 5 stars, calling it "puzzling, bewildering and utterly beautiful."

In February 2007, American webzine Somewhere Cold voted Palmless Prayer / Mass Murder Refrain No. 7 on their 2006 Somewhere Cold Awards Hall of Fame.

Track listing

Personnel
Credits adapted from liner notes.

Mono
 Takaakira "Taka" Goto – music
 Yoda – music
 Tamaki – music
 Yasunori Takada – music

World's End Girlfriend
 Katsuhiko Maeda – music, recording, mixing

Additional musicians
 Mujika Easel – chorus vocals
 Takafumi Ishikawa – saxophone
 Kazumasa Hashimoto – piano
 Seigen Tokuzawa – cello
 Kaoru Hagiwara – viola
 Mikiko Ise – violin
 Mio Okamura – violin

Technical
 Seiji Ueki – recording
 Gondo Tomohiko – recording
 Yuuki Mizutani – recording
 Tetsuya Yamamoto – recording
 John Golden – mastering
 Chieko Akasaka – design
 Jeremy DeVine – design
 Chie Tatsumi – photography

References

External links
 

2005 albums
Collaborative albums
Mono (Japanese band) albums
World's End Girlfriend albums
Temporary Residence Limited albums